Joseph-Claude Agyeman Gyau (born September 16, 1992) is an American professional soccer player who plays as a winger for Allsvenskan club Degerfors IF. From 2014 through 2019, Gyau represented the United States national team and earned three caps.

Early life
Born in Tampa, Florida, he grew up in Silver Spring, Maryland, where he played youth soccer for the nearby Bethesda Roadrunners before joining the IMG Soccer Academy in 2009. Gyau is of third-generation pedigree of professional footballers, being the son of former U.S. international Phillip Gyau and the grandson of Joseph "Nana" Gyau, a former Ghanaian international.

Club career
Gyau Signed for Hoffenheim with fellow teammate Charles Renken in 2009. The two were under the age of 18 and could not participate in any matches and were loaned to the Vancouver Whitecaps where they were apart of a residency program from 2009-2010. After the season in Canada It was agreed upon that the two would start out playing for Hoffenheims U19 squad. Shortly after arriving and leading the team in minutes Gyau was moved up to Hoffenheims U23 in 2011. Gyau, only 18, made numerous appearances catching the eye of the first team and was soon moved up once again. Gyau made his Debut for the first team in a DFB pokal match against Greuther Furth in 2011 at the young age of 19. In April 2012 Gyau would sign His first team contract and In August 2012, Gyau was loaned to 2. Bundesliga side FC St. Pauli from TSG 1899 Hoffenheim for the entire season, with an option for another season. He made his League debut for Hoffenheim in April 2014, coming on in the final 21 minutes of a 0–0 draw against Eintracht Frankfurt. In June 2014, Gyau joined Borussia Dortmund. Initially this would only be for the U23 but shortly after he was moved up to the first team to participate in their preseason. Gyau scored a last minute game winner in a friendly match against Heidenheim. Post preseason Gyau remained with the first team and was a regular in the 18 man roster. On September 24, 2014, he made his first team debut for Borussia Dortmund against VfB Stuttgart, coming on in the 74th minute of the match which ended in a 2–2 draw. After being out with injuries for nearly two years, he made his return with Borussia Dortmund II as a substitute on October 29, 2016.

Following Gyau's return to match fitness in January 2017, Gyau moved to 3. Liga side SG Sonnenhof Großaspach on an 18-month deal. During those 18 months Gyau was able to return to form scoring 6 goals and adding 4 assists, earning himself a summer transfer

Gyau moved to MSV Duisburg for their 2018–19 season in Germany's 2nd Bundesliga, tallying 2 goals and 1 assist during the campaign. 

On August 8, 2019, it was announced that Gyau had signed for Major League Soccer side FC Cincinnati. Gyau went on to make 51 total appearances for the club.

International career
Gyau has been capped for the United States at the U-15, U-17, U-20, and U-23 levels. In March 2012, Gyau was called into the US U-23 team for Olympic qualifying matches. The team did not qualify for that year's Summer Olympics.

In November 2012, Gyau was called up to the United States national team. His first start for the US was on September 3, 2014, against the Czech Republic in a friendly match. Gyau made his second start for the national team on October 10, 2014, in a friendly match against Ecuador. After playing less than 15 minutes, he came off the pitch with a suspected sprained left knee and was replaced by Bobby Wood. On October 12, it was announced that Gyau had torn his lateral meniscus and suffered a bone bruise.

In June 2019, Gyau made his first United States national team appearance since 2014 in a friendly match against Jamaica.

Career statistics

Club

References

External links

Living people
1992 births
Association football wingers
American soccer players
American expatriate soccer players in Germany
Bundesliga players
2. Bundesliga players
3. Liga players
TSG 1899 Hoffenheim II players
TSG 1899 Hoffenheim players
FC St. Pauli players
FC St. Pauli II players
Borussia Dortmund players
Borussia Dortmund II players
SG Sonnenhof Großaspach players
MSV Duisburg players
FC Cincinnati players
American sportspeople of Ghanaian descent
Soccer players from Florida
United States men's youth international soccer players
United States men's under-20 international soccer players
United States men's under-23 international soccer players
United States men's international soccer players
Major League Soccer players
American expatriate soccer players